Cambaroides koshewnikowi is a species of crayfish endemic to South Siberia.

References

Cambaridae
Freshwater crustaceans of Asia
Crustaceans described in 1934